Proposition 8, known informally as Prop 8, was a California ballot proposition and a state constitutional amendment intended to ban same-sex marriage; it passed in the November 2008 California state elections and was later overturned in court. The proposition was created by opponents of same-sex marriage in advance of the California Supreme Court's May 2008 appeal ruling, In re Marriage Cases, which followed the short-lived 2004 same-sex weddings controversy and found the previous ban on same-sex marriage (Proposition 22, 2000) unconstitutional. Proposition 8 was ultimately ruled unconstitutional by a federal court (on different grounds) in 2010, although the court decision did not go into effect until June 26, 2013, following the conclusion of proponents' appeals.

Proposition 8 countermanded the 2008 ruling by adding the same provision as in Proposition 22 to the California Constitution, providing that "only marriage between a man and a woman is valid or recognized in California", thereby superseding the 2008 ruling. As an amendment, it was ruled constitutional by the California Supreme Court in Strauss v. Horton, in 2009, on the grounds that it "carved out a limited [or 'narrow'] exception to the state equal protection clause"; in his dissent, Justice Carlos R. Moreno wrote that exceptions to the equal protection clause could not be made by any majority since its whole purpose was to protect minorities against the will of a majority.

Legal challenges to Proposition 8 were presented by opponents quickly after its approval. Following affirmation by the state courts, two same-sex couples filed a lawsuit against the initiative in the United States District Court for the Northern District of California in the case Perry v. Schwarzenegger (later Hollingsworth v. Perry). In August 2010, Chief Judge Vaughn Walker ruled that the amendment was unconstitutional under both the Due Process and Equal Protection Clauses of the Fourteenth Amendment, since it purported to re-remove rights from a disfavored class only, with no rational basis. The official proponents' justifications for the measure were analyzed in over fifty pages covering eighty findings of fact. The state government supported the ruling and refused to defend the law. The ruling was stayed pending appeal by the proponents of the initiative. On February 7, 2012, the Ninth Circuit Court of Appeals, in a 2–1 decision, reached the same conclusion as the district court, but on narrower grounds. The court ruled that it was unconstitutional for California to grant marriage rights to same-sex couples, only to take them away shortly after. The ruling was stayed pending appeal to the United States Supreme Court.

On June 26, 2013, the Supreme Court of the United States issued its decision on the appeal in the case Hollingsworth v. Perry, ruling that proponents of initiatives such as Proposition 8 did not possess legal standing in their own right to defend the resulting law in federal court, either to the Supreme Court or (previously) to the Ninth Circuit Court of Appeals. Therefore, the Supreme Court vacated the decision of the Ninth Circuit, and remanded the case for further proceedings. The decision left the district court's 2010 ruling intact. On June 28, 2013, the Ninth Circuit, on remand, dismissed the appeal for lack of jurisdiction and dissolved their previous stay of the district court's ruling, enabling Governor Jerry Brown to order same-sex marriages to resume.

The passage of Proposition 8 received widespread media coverage over the amendment's effect on the concurrent 2008 presidential and congressional elections, as well as the pre-election effects Proposition 8 had on California's reputation as a historically LGBT-friendly state and the same-sex marriage debate that had started after same-sex marriage was legalized in Massachusetts through a 2004 court decision. After the results were certified and same-sex marriages ceased, supporters of the initiative were targeted by opponents with actions ranging from some opponents disclosing supporter donations and boycotting proponents' businesses, to others threatening supporters with death and vandalizing churches.

Overview
In 2000, the State of California adopted Proposition 22 which, as an ordinary statute, forbade recognition or licensing of same-sex marriages in the state. During February and March 2004, San Francisco Mayor Gavin Newsom directed the licensing of same-sex marriages on the basis of the state's equal protection clause, prompted also by recent events including George W. Bush's proposed constitutional ban, a possible legal case by Campaign for California Families (CCF), and a Supreme Court of Massachusetts ruling deeming same-sex marriage bans unconstitutional and permitting them from May 2004. While only lasting a month before being overruled, this was supported by other cities such as San Jose, gained global attention, and led to the case In re Marriage Cases, in which Proposition 22 was found (San Francisco County Superior Court, March 14, 2005) and confirmed upon appeal (California Supreme Court, May 15, 2008) to be unconstitutional.

Proposition 8 was created by opponents of same-sex marriage prior to the final ruling on In re Marriage Cases as a voter ballot initiative, and voted on at the time of the November 2008 elections. Its wording was precisely the same as Proposition 22, which as an ordinary statute, had been invalidated in 2008, but by re-positioning it as a State constitutional amendment rather than a legislative statute, it was able to circumvent the ruling from In re Marriage Cases. The proposition did not affect domestic partnerships in California, nor (following subsequent legal rulings) did it reverse same-sex marriages that had been performed during the interim period May to November 2008 (i.e. after In re Marriage Cases but before Proposition 8).

Proposition 8 came into immediate effect on November 5, 2008, the day after the elections. Demonstrations and protests occurred across the state and nation. Same-sex couples and government entities, including couples who had married before then, filed numerous lawsuits with the California Supreme Court challenging the proposition's validity and effect on previously administered same-sex marriages. In Strauss v. Horton, the California Supreme Court upheld Proposition 8, but allowed the existing same-sex marriages to stand (under the grandfather clause principle). (Justice Carlos R. Moreno dissented that exceptions to the equal protection clause could not be made by any majority since its whole purpose was to protect minorities against the will of a majority.)

Although upheld in State court, Proposition 8 was ruled unconstitutional by the federal courts. In Perry v. Schwarzenegger, United States District Court Judge Vaughn Walker overturned Proposition 8 on August 4, 2010, ruling that it violated both the Due Process and Equal Protection clauses of the U.S. Constitution. Walker issued a stay (injunction) against enforcing Proposition 8 and a stay to determine suspension of his ruling pending appeal. The State of California did not appeal the ruling (with which it had agreed anyway) leaving the initiative proponents and one county to seek an appeal.

On appeal, a Ninth Circuit Court of Appeals panel ruled the county had no right of appeal, and asked the California Supreme Court to rule whether the proponents of Prop 8 had the right to appeal (known as "standing") if the State did not do so. The California Supreme Court ruled that they did. The Ninth Circuit affirmed the federal district court's decision on February 7, 2012, but the stay remained in place as appeals continued to the U.S. Supreme Court, which heard oral arguments in the appeal Hollingsworth v. Perry on March 26, 2013. On June 26, 2013, the Supreme Court dismissed the appeal and ruled that the Ninth Circuit had erred in allowing the previous appeal, since in line with Article III of the Constitution and many prior cases unanimous on the point, being an initiative proponents is not enough by itself to have federal court standing or appeal a ruling in federal court. This left the original federal district court ruling against Proposition 8 as the outcome, and same sex marriages resumed almost immediately afterwards.

History of the ballot initiative

Proposition 8 (ballot title: Eliminates Rights of Same-Sex Couples to Marry. Initiative Constitutional Amendment; originally titled the "California Marriage Protection Act") was a California ballot proposition that changed the California Constitution to add a new section 7.5 to Article I, which reads: "Only marriage between a man and a woman is valid or recognized in California." This change restricted the definition of marriage to opposite-sex couples, and eliminated same-sex couples' right to marry, thereby overriding portions of the ruling of In re Marriage Cases by "carving out an exception to the preexisting scope of the privacy and due process clauses" of the state constitution.

To qualify for the ballot, Proposition 8 needed 694,354 valid petition signatures, equal to 8% of the total votes cast for governor in the November 2006 general election. The initiative proponents submitted 1,120,801 signatures, and on June 2, 2008, the initiative qualified for the November 4, 2008 election ballot through the random sample signature check.

Full text
Proposition 8 consisted of two sections. Its full text was:
SECTION 1. Title

SECTION 2. Article I, Section 7.5 is added to the California Constitution, to read:

Pre-election legal challenges

Petition to remove proposition from ballot

On July 16, 2008, the California Supreme Court denied a petition calling for the removal of Proposition 8 from the November ballot. The petition asserted the proposition should not be on the ballot on the grounds it was a constitutional revision that only the legislature or a constitutional convention could place before voters. Opponents also argued that the petitions circulated to qualify the measure for the ballot inaccurately summarized its effect. The court denied the petition without comment. As a general rule, it is improper for courts to adjudicate pre-election challenges to a measure's substantive validity. The question of whether Proposition 8 is a constitutional amendment or constitutional revision was ruled on by the California Supreme Court on May 26, 2009, and found that it was not a revision and therefore would be upheld. They also declared that the same-sex marriages performed prior to the passing of Prop 8 would remain valid.

Challenge to title and summary
The measure was titled: "Eliminates Rights of Same-Sex Couples to Marry. Initiative Constitutional Amendment." The ballot summary read that the measure "changes the California Constitution to eliminate the right of same-sex couples to marry in California."

Proponents of the measure objected to the wording of the ballot title and summary on the grounds that they were argumentative and prejudicial. The resulting legal petition Jansson v. Bowen was dismissed August 7, 2008, by California Superior Court Judge Timothy M. Frawley, who ruled that "the title and summary includes an essentially verbatim recital of the text of the measure itself", and that the change was valid because the measure did, in fact, eliminate a right upheld by the California Supreme Court.

California Attorney General Jerry Brown explained that the changes were required to more "accurately reflect the measure" in light of the California Supreme Court's intervening In re Marriage Cases decision.

On July 22, 2008, Proposition 8 supporters mounted a legal challenge to the revised ballot title and summary, contending that Attorney General Brown inserted "language [...] so inflammatory that it will unduly prejudice voters against the measure". Supporters claimed that research showed that an attorney general had never used an active verb like "eliminates" in the title of a ballot measure in the past fifty years in which ballot measures have been used. Representatives of the attorney general produced twelve examples of ballot measures using the word "eliminates" and vouched for the neutrality and accuracy of the ballot language.

On August 8, 2008, the California Superior Court turned down the legal challenge, affirming the new title and summary, stating, "the title and summary is not false or misleading because it states that Proposition 8 would 'eliminate the right of same-sex couples to marry' in California." The Superior Court based their decision on the previous Marriages Cases ruling in which the California Supreme Court held that same-sex couples have a constitutional right to marry under the California Constitution. That same day, proponents of Prop. 8 filed an emergency appeal with the state appeals court. The Court of Appeal denied their petition later that day and supporters did not seek a review by the Supreme Court of California. The deadline for court action on the wording of ballot summaries and arguments in the voter pamphlet was August 11, 2008.

While turning down the challenge to the title and summary, the California Superior Court also found that the Yes on 8 campaign had overstated its ballot argument on the measure's impact on public schools and ordered a minor change in wording. The original arguments included a claim that the Supreme Court's legalization of same-sex marriage requires teachers to tell their students, as young as kindergarten age, that same-sex marriage is the same as opposite-sex marriage. The court said the Yes on 8 argument was false because instruction on marriage is not required and parents can withdraw their children. The court said the ballot argument could be preserved by rewording it to state that teachers "may" or "could" be required to tell children there is no difference between same-sex and opposite-sex marriage.

Campaign

Campaign funding and spending
The pro- and anti-Prop 8 campaigns spent a combined $106 million on the campaign. This was not the most expensive California ballot proposition that year, however; the 2008 campaigns for and against Propositions 94, 95, 96, and 97, dealing with the expansion of Native American gambling, surpassed Prop 8, with combined expenditures of $172 million.

By election day, volunteers on both sides spent thousands of hours getting their messages across to the state's 17.3 million registered voters. The campaigns for and against Proposition 8 raised $39.0 million ($11.3 million or 29.1% from outside California) and $44.1 million ($13.2 million or 30.0% from outside California), respectively, from over 64,000 people in all 50 states and more than 20 foreign countries, setting a new record nationally for a social policy initiative and more than for every other race in the country in spending except the presidential contest. Contributions were much greater than those of previous same-sex marriage initiatives. Between 2004 and 2006, 22 such measures were on ballots around the country, and donations to all of them combined totaled $31.4 million, according to OpenSecrets. A ProtectMarriage.com spokeswoman estimated that 36 companies which had previously contributed to Equality California were targeted to receive a letter requesting similar donations to ProtectMarriage.com.

The California Fair Political Practices Commission fined the LDS Church in 2010 for failing to follow campaign disclosure policies during the last two weeks leading up to the election, which amounted to $37,000 in non-monetary contributions. They were fined $5,538.

Both proponents and opponents of Proposition 8 made significant use of online tactics for campaigning. For example, over 800 videos were posted on YouTube, most consisting of original content and most taking a position against the Proposition. A greater proportion of 'Yes on 8' videos were scripted and professionally produced. Many 'No on 8' videos recorded demonstrations in the aftermath of the election.

Proponents

Proponents of the constitutional amendment argued that exclusively heterosexual marriage was "an essential institution of society", that leaving the constitution unchanged would "result in public schools teaching our kids that gay marriage is okay", and that gay people "do not have the right to redefine marriage for everyone else".

The ProtectMarriage.com organization sponsored the initiative that placed Proposition 8 on the ballot and continues to support the measure. The measure also attracted the support of a number of political figures and religious organizations.

Political figures
Republican presidential nominee and U.S. Senator John McCain released a statement of support for the proposed constitutional amendment. Former Speaker of the House Newt Gingrich released a video in support. Both characterized the court ruling requiring recognition of same sex marriage as being against the will of the people. A political action committee run by former Massachusetts governor Mitt Romney, who personally supported the proposition, donated $10,000 to the National Organization for Marriage during their campaign for the proposition.

Religious organizations
The Roman Catholic Church, as well as a Roman Catholic lay fraternal organization, the Knights of Columbus, firmly supported the measure. The bishops of the California Catholic Conference released a statement supporting the proposition, a position met with mixed reactions among church members, including clergy.

George Hugh Niederauer as Archbishop of San Francisco campaigned in 2008 in favor of the Proposition, and claimed to have been instrumental in forging alliances between Catholics and Mormons to support the measure. His successor, Salvatore Cordileone was regarded as instrumental in devising the initiative. Campaign finance records show he personally gave at least $6,000 to back the voter-approved ban and was instrumental in raising $1.5 million to put the proposition on the ballot. Subsequently, as archbishop of San Francisco, he has called publicly for an amendment to the US Constitution as "the only remedy in law against judicial activism" following the number of state same-sex marriage bans struck down by federal judges. He also attended and addressed the audience at the "March for Marriage", a rally opposing marriage for same-sex couples, in Washington, D.C., in June 2014.

In California's 2008 election the Knights of Columbus attracted media attention when they donated more than $1.4 million to Proposition 8. The Order was the largest financial supporter of the successful effort to maintain a legal definition of marriage as the union of one man and one woman.

The Church of Jesus Christ of Latter-day Saints (LDS Church), also publicly supported the proposition. The First Presidency of the church announced its support for Proposition 8 in a letter intended to be read in every congregation in California. In this letter, church members were encouraged to "do all you can to support the proposed constitutional amendment by donating of your means and time". The church produced and broadcast to its congregations a program describing the support of the Proposition, and describing the timeline it proposes for what it describes as grassroots efforts to support the Proposition. Local church leaders set organizational and monetary goals for their membership—sometimes quite specific—to fulfill this call. The response of church members to their leadership's appeals to donate money and volunteer time was very supportive, such that Latter-day Saints provided a significant source for financial donations in support of the proposition, both inside and outside the State of California. LDS members contributed over $20 million, about 45% of out-of-state contributions to ProtectMarriage.com came from Utah, over three times more than any other state.
ProtectMarriage, the official proponent of Proposition 8, estimates that about half the donations they received came from Mormon sources, and that LDS church members made up somewhere between 80% and 90% of the volunteers for early door-to-door canvassing.

Other religious organizations that supported Proposition 8 include the Union of Orthodox Jewish Congregations of America, Eastern Orthodox Church, a group of Evangelical Christians led by Jim Garlow and Miles McPherson, American Family Association, Focus on the Family and the National Organization for Marriage. Rick Warren, pastor of Saddleback Church, also endorsed the measure.

Others
The Grossmont Union High School District in San Diego County, California, publicly voted on a resolution endorsing Proposition 8. The Governing Board voted 4–0 to endorse the amendment of the California State Constitution.

The Asian Heritage Coalition held a rally in support of Proposition 8 in downtown San Diego on October 19, 2008.

During the November 2008 election campaign, Porterville's City Council was the only City Council in California that passed a Resolution in favor of Proposition 8.

Church of Scientology 
The San Diego branch of the Church of Scientology publicly supported the proposition by signing an online petition asking for Prop 8. This led to award-winning director, producer and writer Paul Haggis to call on Tommy Davis to denounce the signature.

Davis responded to Haggis and told him that it was a single member of the San Diego branch which had signed the petition using the branch name and not a branch decision. Davis then stated that the man had been "handled."

Haggis spent ten months trying to get Scientology to publicly denounce Prop 8, but Scientology remained silent and later said "Davis explained to Haggis that the church avoids taking overt political stands." going further to explain that because they are a non-profit with tax exempt status, they cannot take a political stance or risk losing that status.

Haggis resigned from Scientology after thirty-five years of membership and wrote in his resignation letter that "public sponsorship of Proposition 8, which succeeded in taking away the civil rights of gay and lesbian citizens of California—rights that were granted them by the Supreme Court of our state—is a stain on the integrity of our organization and a stain on us personally. Our public association with that hate-filled legislation shames us."

"Whether You Like It or Not" advertisement
In the months leading up to Election Day, Proposition 8 supporters released a commercial featuring San Francisco Mayor Gavin Newsom stating in a speech regarding same-sex marriage: "This door's wide open now. It's going to happen, whether you like it or not." Some observers noted that polls shifted in favor of Proposition 8 following the release of the commercial; this, in turn, led to much speculation about Newsom's unwitting role in the passage of the amendment.

Opponents

Opponents argued that "the freedom to marry is fundamental to our society", that the California constitution "should guarantee the same freedom and rights to everyone", and that the proposition "mandates one set of rules for gay and lesbian couples and another set for everyone else". They also argued that "equality under the law is a fundamental constitutional guarantee" (see Equal Protection Clause).

Equality for All was the lead organization opposed to Proposition 8. They also ran the NoOnProp8.com campaign. As with the measure's proponents, opponents of the measure also included a number of political figures and religious organizations. Some non-partisan organizations and corporations, as well as the editorial boards of many of the state's major newspapers, also opposed the measure.

Political figures

Democratic presidential nominee and U.S. Senator Barack Obama stated that while he personally considered marriage to be between a man and woman, and supported civil unions that confer comparable rights rather than gay marriage, he opposed "divisive and discriminatory efforts to amend the California Constitution... the U.S. Constitution or those of other states". Democratic vice-presidential candidate Joseph Biden also opposed the proposition. Republican California Governor Arnold Schwarzenegger stated that although he opposed and twice vetoed legislative bills that would recognize same-sex marriage in California, he respected and would uphold the court's ruling and oppose the initiative and other attempts to amend the state's constitution. The U.S. House Speaker, California Representative (8th District), Nancy Pelosi along with other members of the California congressional delegation and both of California's U.S. senators, Dianne Feinstein and Barbara Boxer, voiced their opposition to Proposition 8. Also voicing their opposition were the Lieutenant Governor, State Controller John Chiang, former governor and Attorney General Jerry Brown, 42 of 80 members of the state assembly, half of the state senators, and the mayors of San Francisco, Los Angeles, and San Diego: Gavin Newsom, Antonio Villaraigosa, and Jerry Sanders, respectively.

Religious organizations
All six Episcopal diocesan bishops in California jointly issued a statement opposing Proposition 8 on September 10, 2008. Southern California's largest collection of rabbis, the Board of Rabbis of Southern California, voted to oppose Proposition 8. Other Jewish groups who opposed Proposition 8 include Jewish Mosaic, the American Jewish Committee, Progressive Jewish Alliance, National Council of Jewish Women, and the Anti-Defamation League (ADL). The ADL filed amicus briefs urging the Supreme Court of California, Ninth Circuit, and the Supreme Court to invalidate Prop 8. Los Angeles Jews were more opposed to Prop 8 than any other religious group or ethnic group in the city. Seventy-eight percent of surveyed Jewish Angelenos voted against the measure while only 8% supported the measure; the remainder declined to respond. The legislative ministry of the Unitarian Universalists opposed Proposition 8, and organized phone banks toward defeating the measure. They saw opposition to the proposition as a civil rights and social justice issue and their actions against it as a continuation of their previous works in civil rights.

In addition, the California Council of Churches urged the "immediate removal of Proposition 8"—saying that it infringes on the freedom of religion for churches who wish to bless same-sex unions.

Others
The League of Women Voters of California opposed Proposition 8 because "no person or group should suffer legal, economic or administrative discrimination". Additionally, all but two of the National Association for the Advancement of Colored People's local chapters in California and NAACP national chairman Julian Bond and President Benjamin Jealous opposed Proposition 8. Amnesty International also condemned Proposition 8, saying that "states should never withhold rights based on minority status".

A coalition of Silicon Valley executives urged a 'No' vote on Proposition 8. Google officially opposed Proposition 8 "as an issue of equality", and its founders donated $140,000 to the No on 8 campaign. Apple Inc. also opposed Proposition 8 as a "fundamental" civil rights issue, and donated $100,000 to the No on 8 campaign. Biotech leaders warned of potential damage to the state's $73 billion industry, citing Massachusetts as a top competitor for employees.

Many members of the entertainment industry were opposed to Proposition 8. Actor Tom Hanks, a strong supporter of same-sex marriage, was extremely outspoken about his opposition to the bill. Brad Pitt and Steven Spielberg each donated different amounts of money to the opposition campaign "No on 8". In 2010, the documentary film 8: The Mormon Proposition premiered to sell-out audiences at the Sundance Film Festival.

The Los Angeles Unified School District Board of Education voted unanimously for a resolution to oppose Proposition 8. The California Teachers Association donated one million dollars to fight Proposition 8. Chancellor Robert Birgeneau of UC Berkeley urged a vote against the measure, claiming a likely threat to California's academic competitiveness if Proposition 8 is passed.

Newspaper editorials
All ten of the state's largest newspapers editorialized against Proposition 8, including the Los Angeles Times, and the San Francisco Chronicle. Other papers to have editorialized in opposition include
The New York Times, La Opinión (Los Angeles), and The Bakersfield Californian.

Actions against supporters and opponents

After the election, a number of protests were held against the referendum's passing. These included candlelight vigils outside organizations such as LDS churches that promoted the proposition. Rallies against the amendment took place in California and across the country, with participants numbering in thousands.

Boycotts were also a feature of public response to the outcome of the election. LGBT rights groups published lists of donors to the Yes on 8 campaign and organized boycotts of individuals or organizations who had promoted or donated to it. Targets of the boycotts included the Sundance Film Festival in Utah, El Coyote Cafe, California Musical Theatre, and the Manchester Grand Hyatt Hotel.

Some supporters of Proposition 8 reported receiving death threats, some of which claimed to be "stemming from Prop 8". Some LDS churches were vandalized with spray paint.

Fresno-area supporters of gay marriage were also harassed; "No On 8" signs at the Clovis Unitarian Universalist Church were torn up, with Reverend Bryan Jessup alleging that his church experienced vandalism "every night". Santa Clara County Deputy District Attorney (DDA) Jay Boyarsky attributed a surge in anti-gay hate crimes, from 3 in 2007 to 14 in 2008, to controversy over Proposition 8.

Pre-decision opinion polls
Various opinion polls were conducted to estimate the outcome of the proposition. Those margins with differences less than their margins of error are marked as "n.s.", meaning not significant (see Statistical significance). Those margins considered statistically significant are indicated with the percentage points and the side favored in the poll, as either "pro" for in favor of the proposition's passage (e.g., 1% pro), or "con" for against its passage (e.g., 1% con).

According to the director of the Field Poll, the discrepancy between the pre-election polls and ballot results is because "regular church-goers ... were more prone than other voters to be influenced by last-minute appeals to conform to orthodox church positions when voting on a progressive social issue like same-sex marriage."

Results

Amending the California Constitution by voter initiative requires a simple majority to be enacted.

Edison/Mitofsky conducted an exit poll on behalf of the National Election Pool which is the only source of data on voter demographics in California in the 2008 election. The statistical trends from the exit poll of 2,240 voters suggested that an array of voters came out both in opposition to and in support of Proposition 8, with no single demographic group making up most of either the Yes or No vote. The National Election Pool poll showed that support for Proposition 8 was strong amongst African American voters, interviewed in the exit poll with 70% in favor, more than any other racial group. Their support was considered crucial to the proposition's passing, since African Americans made up an unusually larger percentage of voters that year, due to the presence of Barack Obama on the ballot. Polls by both the Associated Press and CNN mirrored this data, reporting support among black voters to be at 70% and 75%, respectively. A later study by the National Gay and Lesbian Task Force (NGLTF), examining the black vote only from five counties within the state, suggested that black support was closer to 58%.

Hispanic and Latino voters also voted for Proposition 8.

Those who described themselves as religious were the strongest supporters of Prop 8. According to the NGLTF study, self-identified Catholics and Protestants supported Prop 8 by measures of 55% and 66%, respectively, while Jews overwhelmingly opposed it, with support at only 17%. Young voters were more likely to have voted against the ballot measure than older voters, while Republicans were more likely to have supported the measure than were Democrats.

County breakdown

Post-election events

Immediate response

In California, a constitutional amendment passed by the electorate takes effect the day after the election. On the evening of November 4 the "Yes on 8" campaign issued a statement by Ron Prentice, the chairman of ProtectMarriage.com, saying "The people of California stood up for traditional marriage and reclaimed this great institution." The organizers of the "No on Prop 8" campaign issued a statement on November 6 saying, "Tuesday's vote was deeply disappointing to all who believe in equal treatment under the law." The counties of Los Angeles, San Francisco, Yolo, Kern, Santa Barbara, San Luis Obispo, Sonoma, San Diego, San Bernardino, Sacramento, and Tuolumne stopped issuing marriage licenses to same-sex couples the day after the election.

Following the passage of Proposition 8, mass protests took place across the state. These included protests outside the LDS Church's Los Angeles California Temple in Westwood, Los Angeles; a march through Hollywood that blocked traffic and elicited police intervention; a candlelight vigil in front of the Sacramento Gay and Lesbian Center and a large demonstration in front of the state capitol. 
In San Francisco, thousands gathered in front of the City Hall, along with Mayor Gavin Newsom, to protest the proposition and to perform a candlelight vigil.

Fines
Following an audit by the California Franchise Tax Board, the proponents of Proposition 8 are facing a fine of $49,000 for violating California campaign finance disclosure laws, by failing to report $1,169,292 in contributions under the timelines required by state law.

Protests 
Following the passage of Proposition 8, mass protests took place across the state. These included protests outside a temple of The Church of Jesus Christ of Latter-day Saints in Westwood, Los Angeles; a march through Hollywood that blocked traffic and elicited police intervention; and a candlelight vigil in front of the Sacramento Gay and Lesbian Center.

On Sunday November 9 an estimated crowd of 4,000 people protested in front of the California State Capitol. In San Francisco, thousands gathered in front of the City Hall to protest the proposition and to perform a candlelit vigil. Speakers who voiced their opinion in opposition of Proposition 8 included state senator Mark Leno and mayor Gavin Newsom.

Outside California, a protest at the headquarters of The Church of Jesus Christ of Latter-day Saints in Salt Lake City, Utah was addressed by local gay rights supporters including former Salt Lake City Mayor Rocky Anderson and three gay members of the Utah Legislature: Senator Scott McCoy and Representatives Christine Johnson and Jackie Biskupski. On November 12, 2008, more than 10,000 protesters gathered outside the Manhattan New York Temple to protest the support of The Church of Jesus Christ of Latter-day Saints for Proposition 8. On November 15, 2008, tens of thousands of people in cities around the United States participated in rallies to protest the passage of Proposition 8 and to promote the expansion of civil marriage to same-sex couples throughout the nation.

Boycotts
The passage of Proposition 8 led to opponents responding by publicly shaming its supporters as bigots and boycotting supporters' businesses and employers. On November 7, 2008, a blogger revealed that Scott Eckern, then Artistic Director of California Musical Theatre, had made a personal donation of $1,000 to the "Yes on 8" campaign. All campaign contributions of $1,000 or more required a name, home and occupation be listed. On November 10, gay artists condemned Eckern and called for a boycott of California Musical Theatre. On November 11, Eckern issued an apology on the online site Playbill stating that a similar donation had been made to a human rights organization that includes gay rights as one of its causes. On November 12, Eckern resigned from California Musical Theatre. Executive producer of the CMT Richard Lewis stated that Eckern was not forced to resign but did so of his own accord.

Richard Raddon, Director of the Los Angeles Film Festival, also resigned due to boycotts by the gay community.

Protests in California were marred by racial incidents. Due to their support of Proposition 8, reported as high as 70 percent, some African Americans attending events were allegedly subjected to racial epithets and felt threatened. California Assembly Speaker Karen Bass stated she was disturbed by the treatment of African Americans in the aftermath of the passage of the proposition.
In reaction to the racial incidents, Evan Wolfson said, "In any fight, there will be people who say things they shouldn't say, but that shouldn't divert attention from what the vast majority are saying against this, that it's a terrible injustice."

Media
To protest the passage of Proposition 8, musical theatre composer Marc Shaiman wrote a satiric mini-musical called "Prop 8 — The Musical". The three-minute video was distributed on the internet at FunnyOrDie.com. The cast includes Jack Black (who plays Jesus), Nicole Parker, Neil Patrick Harris, John C. Reilly, Allison Janney, Andy Richter, Maya Rudolph, Margaret Cho, Rashida Jones, Kathy Najimy, Sarah Chalke, Jennifer Lewis, John Hill and other celebrities. It was directed by Adam Shankman. The video satirizes Christian churches that selectively pick and choose biblical doctrines to follow. It received 1.2 million internet hits in its first day, won the 2009 Webby Award category Comedy: Individual Short or Episode, and won a GLAAD media award.

In 2010, 8: The Mormon Proposition, a documentary alleging the involvement of the Church of Jesus Christ of Latter-day Saints in the passage of Proposition 8. Written by Reed Cowan and narrated by Dustin Lance Black, the film divided critics over a perceived heavy-handed approach to the church's involvement; it won the 2011 GLAAD Media Award for Outstanding Documentary.

In 2011, 8, a play re-enacting the proceedings of Perry v. Brown in a condensed manner of documentary theatre, was premiered on Broadway.

Controversies about campaign financing and donations
On November 13, 2008, Fred Karger of the group Californians Against Hate filed a complaint with the California Fair Political Practices Commission that campaign finance reports filed by The Church of Jesus Christ of Latter-day Saints under-reported its actual Proposition 8 campaign expenses as $2,078.97. Karger charged that the Church's failure to report "non-monetary contributions" placed it in violation of California's Political Reform Act. Church spokesman Scott Trotter denied the charges, saying the church had "fully complied with the reporting requirements" and a "further report will be filed on or before [...the] due date, Jan. 30, 2009."

In a report filed with the California Secretary of State's office January 30, 2009, the LDS Church reported its non-monetary expenditures as $189,903.58. On January 31, the San Francisco Chronicle stated, "While the deadline for the report, which covers the period from July 1 to Dec. 31, is [February 2], many campaign contributions by major donors and independent committees must be reported within days after they're made." The article further stated that the executive director of the FPPC stated that the LDS church was still under investigation, and "In general, however, 'cases like these hinge over what had to be reported and when it had to be reported.' A late report covering disputed filings 'wouldn't remove the obligation to file on time' but would be considered by investigators."

The Boston Herald reported on February 2, 2009:

In a statement issued February 2, 2009, the LDS Church responded to "erroneous news reports", saying its subsequent disclosure was "in no way prompted by an investigation by the California Fair Political Practices Commission," that "We believe we have complied with California law," and that the report's filing date met the January 31, 2009 deadline:

On January 7, 2009, supporters of Proposition 8 filed a federal lawsuit to block public disclosure of their donations. Alleging threats against their lives as well as other forms of harassment, the lawsuit also requested a preliminary injunction that ordered the California Secretary of State to remove information about donations posted on its website. Opponents of Proposition 8 called it "hypocritical" that its supporters would refer to their support of the measure as the "will of the people" while seeking to overturn voter-approved campaign disclosure laws. U.S. District Judge Morrison England, Jr. denied that request on January 29; he said that the public had the right to know about donors of political causes, that he did not agree that the plaintiffs had a probability of success in court, and that they had not proven they would suffer "irreparable injury" if he did not grant the preliminary injunction.

Litigation

California Supreme Court cases

After the passage of Proposition 8, a number of lawsuits were filed by against the state and state officials with the intent of overturning the measure and arguing that Proposition 8 should not have retroactive effect on existing same-sex marriages. On November 13, 2008, the California Supreme Court asked California Attorney General Jerry Brown for an opinion on whether the Court should accept these cases for review and whether the measure should be suspended while they decide the case. On November 19, the Court accepted three lawsuits challenging Proposition 8 but denied the requests to stay its enforcement. The Court asked for final briefs by January 5, 2009. Oral arguments were held on March 5, 2009.

On Tuesday May 26 the court ruled that "The Amendment to the State Constitution referred to as Proposition 8 is valid and enforceable from the moment it was passed." The court also held that "Proposition 8 must be understood as creating a limited exception to the state equal protection clause." Justice Moreno in his lone dissenting opinion, argued that such a change to the Constitution should only be implemented "by a constitutional revision to modify the equal protection clause to protect some, rather than all, similarly situated persons" and not by a simple majority vote.

The Court did rule that their decision cannot be applied to retroactively annul marriages that were transacted while the practice was legal in the state of California. Proposition 8 has no retroactive effect. The California Supreme Court ruled unanimously on May 26, 2009, that the approximately 18,000 same-sex marriages that had occurred prior to Proposition 8's passage would still be valid and must continue to be recognized in the state, since the amendment does not state explicitly that it would nullify the same-sex marriages performed before it took effect.

Later legislation clarified that same-sex couples who married out-of-state within the window of legality would also retain their legal marriage rights. The bill was signed by Governor Arnold Schwarzenegger on October 11, 2009.

Federal challenges

Smelt v. United States
Immediately following the passage of Proposition 8, Arthur Smelt and Christopher Hammer filed suit in the Southern Division of the United States District Court for the Central District of California, in Orange County. In the case, Smelt v. United States, the couple argued that Proposition 8 and the Federal Defense of Marriage Act violated the Equal Protection Clause of the American constitution. The United States Justice Department filed a motion to dismiss the case because the "plaintiffs are married, and their challenge to the federal Defense of Marriage Act ("DOMA") poses a different set of questions." On July 15, 2009, District Judge Carter dismissed the part of Smelt that challenged Proposition 8, finding that the fact that the plaintiffs were already legally married in California meant they had no standing to challenge Proposition 8. The challenge to the Defense of Marriage Act, however, remained intact. The remainder of the case was heard on August 3, 2009, in an Orange County district court. The lawsuit was thrown out because the two men had filed suit against the federal government in a state court, a technicality which meant the suit needed to be re-filed.

Perry v. Schwarzenegger

On the day of Strauss v. Horton decision, the American Foundation for Equal Rights (AFER) filed suit in U.S. District Court for the Northern District of California to challenge the validity of Proposition 8. Lambda Legal, the ACLU, and the National Center for Lesbian Rights have since announced their support for the lawsuit. San Francisco filed a motion to and was granted intervenor status in the case, saying that their work in In re Marriage Cases and Strauss v. Horton provided them with "extensive evidence and proposed findings on strict scrutiny factors and factual rebuttals to long claimed justifications for marriage discrimination".

California Attorney General, and former and later again Governor Jerry Brown backed the lawsuit, saying that Proposition 8 violates the U.S. Constitution and should be struck down. Governor Arnold Schwarzenegger took a more neutral path, saying that he supported the lawsuit because the Proposition 8 conflict asks "important constitutional questions that require and warrant judicial determination." Because this means that the Californian government will not defend the law in court, the proponents of Proposition 8's campaign were granted the right to intervene as defendants. The case was first heard on July 2, 2009, in the United States District Court for the Northern District of California in San Francisco, Judge Vaughn R. Walker presiding.

In an act unprecedented in California history both the Governor and Attorney General refused to defend a constitutional amendment.

In August, Judge Walker heard further requests for intervenor status and ordered a trial set for January 2010.
On August 4, 2010, U.S. District Chief Judge Vaughn R. Walker ruled Proposition 8 unconstitutional, but at the same time temporarily provided for a suspension of the ruling while he considered whether to grant an indefinite suspension pending appeal. Walker lifted the stay on August 12, 2010, thus allowing same-sex marriages to be performed as of August 18, 2010

On August 16, 2010, the United States Court of Appeals for the Ninth Circuit imposed a stay of all new same-sex marriages in the State of California. It also scheduled an accelerated time table for hearing an appeal of Judge Walker's ruling. Before the appeal trial begins, there will be a December 6, 2010 hearing on who has legal standing to appeal the District Court's decision and whether the proposition violates equal protection rights.

Ballot repeal effort
On April 30, 2009, the members of 'Yes! on Equality' submitted a ballot initiative dubbed "California Marriage Equality Act" to the Attorney General's office, requesting a title and summary. The text of the ballot would repeal Article I; Section 7.5 of the Californian Constitution as well as clarifying that no school curriculum will be changed and no clergy will be forced to perform any "service or duty incongruent with their faith". Yes! on Equality had until August 17, 2009, to gather 694,354 signatures in order to qualify for the June 2010 ballot, A petition for initiative for the November 2010 ballot also failed to obtain enough signatures.

Several LGBT groups of color (including API Equality-LA, HONOR PAC, and the Jordan/Rustin Coalition) published a statement "Prepare to Prevail," in which they argue that the ballot repeal effort should be delayed until 2012. As of February 2012, the repeal effort was canceled in light of victorious court cases.

On February 14, 2023, following comments by Clarence Thomas in the U.S. Supreme Court decision Dobbs v. Jackson Women's Health Organization that call for a review of Obergefell v. Hodges, Evan Low introduced ACA-5, a legislatively referred constitutional amendment repealing the ban on same-sex marriage for the 2024 California elections; activists agreed that 2024 would be the earliest date for a ballot measure to prevent competition of attention with 2022 California Proposition 1.

Legal challenges
Following the passing of Proposition 8 in 2008, and the subsequent mass protests, several lawsuits were filed in both the State Supreme Court and in the Federal District Court.

State court: Strauss v. Horton 

In considering the cases within the state courts, on November 13, 2008, the California Supreme Court asked California Attorney General Jerry Brown for an opinion on whether the Court should accept these cases for review and whether the measure should be suspended while they decide the case. On November 19, the Court accepted three lawsuits challenging Proposition 8, which consolidated into Strauss v. Horton. The Court rendered its decision on May 26, 2009. The majority decision was that Proposition 8 "carved out a limited [or 'narrow'] exception to the state equal protection clause"; Justice Moreno dissented that exceptions to the equal protection clause could not be made by any majority since its whole purpose was to protect minorities against the will of a majority. Until overturned by Hollingsworth v. Perry (below), the ruling established that Proposition 8 was valid as voted, but that marriages performed before it went into effect would remain valid.

Federal court

Perry v. Schwarzenegger
After the California Supreme Court upheld the voter initiative, a suit, Perry v. Schwarzenegger (later Hollingsworth v. Perry), was filed in a Federal District Court in San Francisco. On August 4, 2010, U.S. District Chief Judge Vaughn Walker overturned Proposition 8, stating it is "...unconstitutional under the Due Process Clause because no compelling state interest justifies denying same-sex couples the fundamental right to marry." The court also determined that "Proposition 8 violated the Equal Protection Clause because there is no rational basis for limiting the designation of 'marriage' to opposite-sex couples." The court also stayed the ruling; the voter initiative was to remain in effect pending appeal. On August 12, Walker announced his decision to lift the stay (which would have allowed same-sex marriages to be performed) .
However, on August 16, 2010, the United States Court of Appeals for the Ninth Circuit indefinitely extended the District Court's stay, stopping new same-sex marriages in the state of California pending appeal. It also scheduled an accelerated time table for hearing an appeal of Walker's ruling.

Perry v. Brown (on appeal)
As the State of California chose not to appeal the ruling, an appeal was sought by two parties—the initiative proponents, and Imperial County (via its deputy clerk). The Ninth Circuit Court of Appeals considered the question of standing first. On January 4, 2011, the Ninth Circuit ruled that Imperial County did not have standing to intervene in the lawsuit (by now called Perry v. Brown)—the formal reason being the county's appeal had been "untimely", but also that the appellant was the county's deputy clerk, and precedent existed in other cases that a deputy clerk could not 'represent' a county.

To address the question whether the initiative proponents had particularized standing (that is, standing either via personal interest, or standing to represent the State's interest), the Ninth Circuit certified a question to the California Supreme Court on January 4, 2011, asking that court to rule whether, under the California Constitution or otherwise under California law, non-governmental proponents of an initiative have standing to appeal when the State is no longer willing to defend it. On February 16, 2011, the California Supreme Court unanimously agreed to address the Ninth Circuit's request. The court set an expedited schedule for the hearing and heard oral arguments on September 6, 2011. On November 17, 2011, the California Supreme Court issued an advisory opinion that the proponents of Proposition 8 did have standing, and could defend it.

Ninth Circuit ruling

On February 7, 2012, a three-judge panel on the Ninth Circuit Court of Appeals issued a 2–1 majority opinion affirming the judgment in Perry v. Schwarzenegger, which declared Proposition 8 unconstitutional, saying it violated the Equal Protection Clause. The opinion, written by Judge Stephen Reinhardt and joined by Judge Michael Hawkins, states that Proposition 8 did nothing more than lessen the status and dignity of gays and lesbians, and classify their relationships and families as inferior to those of opposite-sex couples. The court found that the people of California, by using their initiative power to target a minority group and withdraw the right to marry they once possessed under the California State Constitution, violated the federal Constitution.

The court concluded that the trial court had correctly found Proposition 8 to have no purpose other than to impose the majority's private disapproval of gays, lesbians, and their relationships through the public law, and to take away from them the designation of marriage and its recognized societal status. The findings of fact and expert witness testimony in District Court played an important role in this appellate decision, emphasizing that it is unreasonable to believe Proposition 8 was enacted to: promote childrearing by biological parents, encourage procreation, be cautious in social change, protect religious liberty, or control children's education. The court declared that it is "implausible to think that denying two men or two women the right to call themselves married could somehow bolster the stability of families headed by one man and one woman".

The dissenting judge, Judge N. Randy Smith, noted in his dissent that states do legitimately prohibit sexual relationships condemned by society such as incest, bigamy, and bestiality, and impose age limits for marriage without violating constitutional rights. He stated that "gays and lesbians are not a suspect or quasi-suspect class" and are thus not entitled to the courts' increased scrutiny of laws that affect them. He wrote, "The family structure of two committed biological parents—one man and one woman—is the optimal partnership for raising children." He also said that governments have a legitimate interest in "a responsible procreation theory, justifying the inducement of marital recognition only for opposite-sex couples" because only they can have children. He urged judicial restraint, that the justices should refrain from striking down Proposition 8.

En banc review denied
On February 21, 2012, proponents requested to have to the case reviewed en banc by the Ninth Circuit Court of Appeals. If granted, en banc review could have taken a year or more, which would have delayed possible U.S. Supreme Court review. Pending the appeal, a stay was continued, barring any marriages from taking place. On June 5, 2012, the full Ninth Circuit refused to rehear the case; the stay would remain in place pending final action by the Supreme Court.

The Ninth Court's ruling was subsequently vacated (withdrawn) although it affirmed the district court ruling, since the Supreme Court later determined that the proponents of Proposition 8 had not had standing to appeal the district court's ruling.

Hollingsworth v. Perry (U.S. Supreme Court)
The proposition's proponents filed a petition for certiorari with the U.S. Supreme Court on July 30, 2012, requesting that the Supreme Court review the case. Briefs in opposition both from the individual respondents and from the City and County of San Francisco were filed August 24, and the petitioners replied on September 4. On December 7, 2012, the Supreme Court granted the proponents' petition for certiorari and asked to be briefed for arguments concerning the petitioners' Article III standing, amid considerable anticipation of a finding of a lack of justiciability in order to avoid a holding on the merits. Oral arguments were heard on March 26, 2013.

Parties who lodged amicus briefs with the court included: Judge Georg Ress and the Marriage Law Foundation; William N. Eskridge, Jr., et al.; the Center for Constitutional Jurisprudence; the Public Advocate of the United States, et al.; the National Association of Evangelicals, et al.; the American Civil Rights Union; Judicial Watch, Inc., et al.; the Eagle Forum Education & Legal Defense Fund, Inc.; the Foundation for Moral Law; and the state of Indiana, et al.

The Supreme Court issued a 5–4 decision on June 26, 2013. Chief Justice Roberts wrote for the majority, and was joined by Justices Scalia, Ginsburg, Breyer, and Kagan. Justices Kennedy, Thomas, Alito, and Sotomayor were in the minority. The Court found the proponents did not have standing to appeal in federal court. To have standing, they "must have suffered an injury in fact, thus giving [them] a sufficiently concrete interest in the outcome of the issue in dispute". Because no injury had been shown, the appeal to the Ninth Circuit should have been dismissed for lack of jurisdiction. (This only applied to the Ninth Circuit and Supreme Court cases.) The Court returned the case to the Ninth Circuit with instructions to dismiss the appeal. This left the district court's ruling overturning Proposition 8 as the final ruling in the case. Because the appeal was decided on the question of standing, the Supreme Court did not examine nor rule on whether in their view Proposition 8 had violated the U.S. Constitution.

Justice Kennedy, writing for the minority, said the views of the California Supreme Court on the proponents' standing should have been respected, because "the basic premise of the initiative process [and] the essence of democracy is that the right to make law rests in the people and flows to the government, not the other way around".

Aftermath 

On June 28, 2013, the Ninth Circuit lifted its stay of the district court's ruling, enabling same-sex marriages to resume; minutes afterward, plaintiffs Perry and Stier became the first couple in California to legally wed under state law since the enactment of Proposition 8 in 2008, doing so at San Francisco City Hall at 4:45 PDT, with California's Attorney General Kamala Harris officiating at the ceremony.

There were two legal challenges made to the implementation of the ruling, both subsequently denied:

Federal court legal challenge to removal of stay

State court legal challenges to statewide implementation of ruling

See also

 Proposition 22
 Briggs Initiative
 Houston Proposition 1 (2015)—a veto referendum which led to the repealing of an ordinance protecting LGBTQ rights.
 LGBT rights in California
 List of former U.S. state constitutional amendments banning same-sex unions by type
 Obergefell v. Hodges—a 2015 U.S. Supreme Court case holding that the right to marry is guaranteed to same-sex couples.
 San Francisco 2004 same-sex weddings—a prior controversy that sparked In re Marriage Cases and led to Proposition 8
 SaveCalifornia.com
 United States v. Windsor—a 2013 U.S. Supreme Court case, decided along with Hollingsworth v. Perry, that struck down Section 3 of the Defense of Marriage Act, thereby granting federal benefits to same sex couple who are married under state law
 8 (or 8 the Play)—an American play that portrays the closing arguments of Perry v. Schwarzenegger, the federal trial that led to the overturn of Proposition 8

References

External links

 The District Court's decision in Perry v Schwarzenegger (Prop 8 Unconstitutional)
 The Ninth Circuit Court of Appeals Decision Affirming Perry v Schwarzenegger (Prop 8 Unconstitutional)
 Video—Ninth Circuit Appeals Court Trial on the Merits
 Video—Ninth Circuit Appeals Court Trial on Recusal
 ProtectMarriage.com: Organizational sponsor of Proposition 8
 No On Prop. 8: Organizational opponent to Proposition 8
 California Official Voter Information Guide on Proposition 8, Title and summary, analysis, arguments and rebuttals, and the text of the proposition.
 Scan of Initiative from California Attorney General website
 The Money Behind the 2008 Same-Sex Partnership Ballot Measures—OpenSecrets
 Proposition 8 map a detailed hyper-linked map on David Leips election atlas.
 Hollingsworth v. Perry at SCOTUSblog
 Amicus briefs filed in Hollingsworth v. Perry from the City Attorney of San Francisco

 
Articles containing video clips
Initiatives in the United States
Opposition to same-sex marriage
Same-sex marriage ballot measures in the United States
8